Maia Krall Fry is documentary and fiction film director. After gaining recognition for directing the feature film Ebony Road, Maia went on to direct the short film Six Degrees produced by Steel Mill Pictures. Her style focuses heavily on sharing nature, science, and evocative human stories in a poetic and lyrical way.

Films have been screened nationwide at festivals, including multiple times at the BFI, and have been supported by Film 4, the Guardian, Oxford University Press, BBC Scotland, and Stephen Fry. Forthcoming projects include the 2015 web-series Wilder, profiling people who have a strong interaction with nature.

Career
Maia’s most recognized work is the award-winning feature film Ebony Road which was highly commended by industry professionals and won the award for Best Drama at the prestigious 2011 Portobello Film Festival Grand Awards Ceremony. It has since screened at many festivals and venues including at the British Film Institute and Maia here took part in a Q&A at the 5th BFI Future Film Festival on 'How to make your first feature'.

Maia immediately went on to direct the short film Six Degrees on behalf of Steel Mill Pictures and the Hep C Trust. Six Degrees premiered at the 2011 V Festival, won the Choose Life Film Competition, and stars Sam Spruell, Georgia Groome, Sam Spruell, and Laura Aikman & Paul Andrew Williams.

Fiction directing work includes multi award-winning short film Sunder which screened at the BFI London Lesbian & Gay Film Festival and the BFI Imax; the charity single by The Other Guys (University of St Andrews) in aid of Breast Cancer Care which became popular on YouTube; and short film Witches for the Film 4 Scene Stealers competition made the shortlist of the top 30 from the 500 entrants with judges including Anna Higgs, Joe Cornish, Asif Kapadia and Lone Scherfig.

Documentaries include a short which was one of four live finalists in a nationwide film competition run by the Guardian and Oxford University Press after a round of global online voting, and several upcoming independent documentary projects. At the Guardian event, she held a talk titled Story of our Landscapes In 2015, Maia graduated with a First Class degree in Geology from the University of St Andrews where she held a Ted X talk titled How the Earth Shapes Us.

Filmography

Awards and nominations

Notes

External links
 
 Official Ebony Road Site
 Steel Mill Pictures
 

1992 births
Living people
English film actresses
Actresses from London
English film directors
English geologists